Mehmed Ali Pasha (November 18, 1827 – September 7, 1878) was a Prussian-born Ottoman career officer and marshal. He was the grandfather of the Turkish statesman Ali Fuat Cebesoy, and the great-grandfather of famous poets Nâzım Hikmet and Oktay Rıfat Horozcu and the socialist activist, lawyer, and athlete Mehmet Ali Aybar.

Biography

Mehmed Ali was born as Ludwig Karl Friedrich Detroit (also known as Carl Detroy) in Magdeburg, Prussia. His parents were Carl Friedrich Detroit and Henriette Jeanette Severin. The French family name points to Huguenot ancestry, as a descendant of Protestant refugees from France in the 16th or 17th century. During his teenage years in 1843 he ran away to sea, and traveled to the Ottoman Empire, where he converted to Islam and was circumcised. There, in 1846, Âli Pasha, later Grand Vizier, sent him to a military school. He received a commission in the Ottoman Army in 1853 and fought against Russia in the Crimean War. He was made a brigadier general and Pasha in 1865.

In the 1877–1878 war against Russia, Mehmed Ali led the Turkish army in Bulgaria. He was successful in his operations on the Lom river (August–September 1877), but was afterward forced back by his opponents. He failed to effect a junction with Süleyman Hüsnü Pasha, and was superseded by the latter. Later in 1878 he was a participant at the Congress of Berlin.

Death

In August 1878, the Ottoman government selected him to overview the process of the cession of the Plav-Gucia region to Montenegro in compliance to the decisions of the Congress of Berlin. Mehmed Ali Pasha's first task was the pacification of the Albanian League of Prizren, which opposed the border change as part of the areas (Plav-Gucia/Plav-Gusinje) were inhabited by ethnic Albanians. He arrived in Kosovo in late August, attempting to make local Albanians comply with the Berlin Treaty but was blocked from any further movement towards the Ottoman-Montenegrin border by the local committees of the Albanian League. Stationed in Abdullah Pasha Dreni's estate in Gjakova with several Ottoman battalions he was killed on September 6 after a seven-day battle with several thousand Albanians opposing cession of Albanian inhabited lands to European powers.

Sources

Family tree

1827 births
1878 deaths
German people of French descent
German emigrants to the Ottoman Empire
People from the Ottoman Empire of French descent
Converts to Islam from Protestantism
German Muslims
Pashas
People from Brandenburg an der Havel
Ottoman Military Academy alumni
Ottoman Military College alumni
Ottoman Army generals
Field marshals of the Ottoman Empire
Ottoman military personnel of the Crimean War
Ottoman military personnel of the Russo-Turkish War (1877–1878)
Serbian–Turkish Wars (1876–1878)